Vital Ingredient was a UK brand which operated a chain of made-to-order salad and soup bars in London, mainly based in the City and around Soho.

Vital Ingredient primarily marketed its own range of salads and soups made on site.  Juices, smoothies and hot breakfasts were also included on the menu.   Each store utilised an American style counter service format to assemble meal orders from individual ingredients within view of the customers.

The company was founded by Alex Heynes, with the first Vital Ingredient store opening in Soho in 2001. It expanded to 5 stores by 2008.

In 2011 Vital Ingredient secured £2.75 million in funding from Santander Corporate & Commercial’s Breakthrough programme. The company's annual turnover has since doubled to £12 million.

From 2011 to 2015 the company tripled its number of outlets after the company took on some equity investment from property entrepreneur Paul Oberschneider and in 2015 opened its 17th outlet on Artillery Row in Victoria. In early 2015 Paolo Peretti was appointed managing director.

In April 2016 the chain underwent a £12m management buyout led by Heynes & Peretti, which was backed by private equity house LDC. 

The chain also secured £4 million in growth capital from Santander as they look to grow to over 40 stores.

In January 2018, Vital Ingredient went through a pre-pack administration and was acquired by FCFM Group.  13 stores were acquired and 7 were closed permanently as a result.

In March 2018, Tossed Tossed (retail) announced they had bought the Vital Ingredient chain from FCFM Group.

In July 2020, during the first lockdown for COVID19 in central London, Zest Food, the company trading as both Tossed and Vital Ingredient, filed a notice of intention to appoint administrators.  

The Vital Ingredient brand has not been traded since the COVID19 pandemic.

References

Restaurant groups in the United Kingdom